Saint-Christophe-sur-le-Nais is a commune in the Indre-et-Loire department in central France.

Geography
The railway linking Caen, Le Mans and Tours ensures a regular traffic for goods and passengers at the Saint-Paterne-Racan station located  SE. There are daily buses to Tours. The river Escotais is full of fish and attracts many fishermen.

History
The village was founded around the year 1000. It received fortifications in the 13th century.  On the other side of the railway, the agglomerated part, Le Faubourg de Vienne had workmen of flourishing industries of the commune.  Saint-Christophe-sur-le-Nais includes the presence of many underground cavities, many slopes that used to be covered with vines add the undeniable charm to the village.

Population

In 1999, 20% of the population were under the age of 20.

Employment
The commune's unemployment rate ranges from 29% to 33%.

See also
Communes of the Indre-et-Loire department

References

External links

 Official Web site
 Old postcards of the commune

Communes of Indre-et-Loire